Piz Cartas is a mountain of the Oberhalbstein Alps, located west of Savognin in the canton of Graubünden.

References

External links

 Piz Cartas on Hikr

Mountains of the Alps
Mountains of Switzerland
Mountains of Graubünden
Two-thousanders of Switzerland
Surses